Glen Thomas Parker (born 12 January 1945) is a former Australian rules footballer who played with South Melbourne in the Victorian Football League (VFL).

Notes

External links 

Glen Parker's playing statistics from The VFA Project

Living people
1945 births
Australian rules footballers from Victoria (Australia)
Sydney Swans players